Elfe Gerhart (1919–2007) was an Austrian stage and film actress. She was married to the actor Paul Dahlke, and is sometimes known as Elfe Gerhart-Dahlke.

Selected filmography
 Finale (1938)
 Konzert in Tirol (1938)
 Detours to Happiness (1939)
 Arlberg Express (1948)
 Vagabonds (1949)
 Mysterious Shadows (1949)
 Request Concert (1955)
 All the Sins of the Earth (1958)

References

Bibliography
 Fritsche, Maria. Homemade Men In Postwar Austrian Cinema: Nationhood, Genre and Masculinity . Berghahn Books, 2013.

External links

1919 births
2007 deaths
Austrian film actresses
Austrian stage actresses
Actresses from Vienna